Lanny Tria Mayasari (born 8 May 2002) is an Indonesian badminton player affiliated with Jaya Raya Satria Yogyakarta club. She was part of the Indonesian women's winning team at the 2022 Asia Team Championships.

Career 
Mayasari won her first international title at the 2018 Jakarta Open Junior International Championships in the U-17 girls' doubles event partnered with Tryola Nadia. She made her debut in the BWF World Tour in the 2018 Bangka Belitung Indonesia Masters, but she had to suffer defeat in the early round.

In February 2020, Mayasari advanced to the finals of the Italian Junior International in both girls' and mixed doubles events, but the tournament was canceled due to the outbreak of COVID-19 in Italy. She then took part at the Dutch Junior International, and won the girls' doubles event with Jesita Putri Miantoro.

2022 
She was selected to join the national team participated in the 2022 Asia Team Championships and Uber Cup, and the team won the Asia title after beating South Korea in the final. In the Uber Cup, the team was stopped in the quarter-finals to China. Mayasari and Miantoro then reached the finals in the senior tournament, Bonn International, and had to finished the tournament as runner-up. In July, they lost in the first round of the Singapore Open from 5th seed Chinese pair Zhang Shuxian and Zheng Yu.

In October, Mayasari was paired with Ribka Sugiarto and lost in the second round of 2022 Vietnam Open, but won the Malang Indonesia International, her first senior title. In December, Mayasari and Sugiarto won their second titles at the Bahrain International Challenge.

2023 
Mayasari and her partner, Ribka Sugiarto, started the BWF tour in the home tournament, Indonesia Masters, but lost in the second round from Indian pair Tanisha Crasto and Ashwini Ponnappa. In the next tournament, they lost in the quarter-finals of the Thailand Masters from Korean pair Baek Ha-na and Lee So-hee.

In February, Mayasari join the Indonesia national badminton team to compete at the Badminton Asia Mixed Team Championships, but unfortunately the teams lost in the quarter-finals from team Korea.

Achievements

BWF International Challenge/Series (2 titles, 1 runner-up) 
Women's doubles

  BWF International Challenge tournament
  BWF International Series tournament
  BWF Future Series tournament

BWF Junior International (1 title) 
Girls' doubles

  BWF Junior International Grand Prix tournament
  BWF Junior International Challenge tournament
  BWF Junior International Series tournament
  BWF Junior Future Series tournament

Performance timeline

National team 
 Senior level

Individual competitions

Senior level

Women's doubles

Mixed doubles

References

External links 
 

2002 births
Living people
People from Sleman Regency
Sportspeople from Special Region of Yogyakarta
Indonesian female badminton players
21st-century Indonesian women